Coghlan Castle is a building in Rolette County, North Dakota, near St. John, North Dakota.  It was listed on the National Register of Historic Places on July 16, 2008, and is the third property that is listed as featured property of the week.
It is of stone construction.

References

External links

Houses in Rolette County, North Dakota
Houses on the National Register of Historic Places in North Dakota
National Register of Historic Places in Rolette County, North Dakota
Houses completed in 1909
Richardsonian Romanesque architecture in North Dakota
1909 establishments in North Dakota